Clavus cygnea is a species of sea snail, a marine gastropod mollusk in the family Drilliidae. This species is mentioned in the Indo-Pacific Molluscan Database as Clavus cygneus

Description
The length of the shell attains 15 mm, its diameter 7 mm.

A pure white, shining, massive little shell with a fusiform shape and 6 - 7 whorls. It shows uniform straight longitudinal ribs. The surface is nearly smooth and shining. The ribs of the last three whorls are continuous, and about eight in number. The aperture is ovate. The siphonal canal is short.

Distribution
This species is found in the demersal zone of tropical waters off Queensland (Australia) and New Caledonia.

References

External links
 Brazier, J. 1876. A list of the Pleurotomidae collected during the Chevert expedition, with the description of the new species. Proceedings of the Linnean Society of New South Wales 1: 151–162
  Hedley, C. 1922. A revision of the Australian Turridae. Records of the Australian Museum 13(6): 213–359, pls 42-56 
  Tucker, J.K. 2004 Catalog of recent and fossil turrids (Mollusca: Gastropoda). Zootaxa 682:1–1295

cygnea
Gastropods described in 1897